The Georgian Football Federation ( GFF; , sakartvelos pekhburtis pederatsia) was founded in 1936. Based in Tbilisi, it was part of the Football Federation of Soviet Union from 1936 to 1989. The Independent Georgian Football Federation was established on 15 February 1990. It is the governing body of football in Georgia. It organizes the football league, the Erovnuli Liga, and the Georgia national football team.

List of the presidents of the Georgian Football Federation

See also
 Georgia women's national football team
 Georgia women's football championship

References

Best Player of Georgian Football Federation "Misho Bubuteishvili"

External links
Official website
Georgia at FIFA site
Georgia at UEFA site

Sports organizations established in 1936
Georgia (country)
Football in Georgia (country)
Futsal in Georgia (country)
1936 establishments in Georgia (country)